General Manoj Mukund Naravane  (born 22 April 1960) is a retired Indian Army General who served as the 27th Chief of the Army Staff (COAS), as well as the temporary Chairman of the Chiefs of Staff Committee from 15 December 2021 until his superannuation on 30 April 2022. He took over as COAS from General Bipin Rawat on 31 December 2019 after the latter completed his term. Prior to his appointment as the COAS, the general served as the 40th Vice Chief of Army Staff (VCOAS) of the Indian Army, General Officer Commanding-in-Chief (GOC-in-C) of Eastern Command and General Officer Commanding-in-Chief of Army Training Command.

Early life and education
Naravane is from Maharashtra. His father, Mukund Naravane, is a former officer in the Indian Air Force who retired in the rank of wing commander and his mother Sudha was an announcer with the All India Radio.
He completed his schooling at the Jnana Prabodhini Prashala in Pune.

Naravane is an alumnus of National Defence Academy, Pune and Indian Military Academy, Dehradun. He also holds a master's degree in Defence Studies from University of Madras, Chennai and an M.Phil. in Defence and Management Studies from Devi Ahilya Vishwavidyalaya, Indore and he is also pursuing PhD in defence and strategic studies from Punjabi University, Patiala. Naravane has attended the Defence Services Staff College, Wellington and the Army War College, Mhow.

Career 

Naravane was commissioned into 7th battalion The Sikh Light Infantry in June 1980. He has commanded the 2nd Battalion (SikhLi) of Rashtriya Rifles in Jammu and Kashmir as well as the 106 Infantry brigade. He has also commanded the Assam Rifles as Inspector General (North) in Kohima, Nagaland. He has served in Counter-insurgency operations in Jammu and Kashmir and Northeast India, as well as the Indian Peace Keeping Force in Sri Lanka during Operation Pawan.

His staff assignments include tenures as a brigade major of an Infantry Brigade, Assistant Adjutant & Quartermaster General (AA&QMG) of Headquarters Establishment No. 22. The General has also served as the Military attaché to Myanmar at Yangon.

In addition, he served in an instructional appointment at the Army War College, Mhow as Directing Staff in the Higher Command Wing and two tenures at the Integrated Defence Staff Headquarters of Ministry of Defence, New Delhi.

On promotion to the rank of lieutenant general, he commanded the Ambala-based Kharga Strike Corps and served as the general officer commanding (GOC) Delhi Area. As GOC Delhi Area, he commanded the 2017 Republic Day Parade.

After being promoted to Army Commander grade, Naravane served as General Officer Commanding-in-Chief Army Training Command from 1 December 2017 to 30 September 2018. Later, he also served as General Officer Commanding-in-Chief Eastern Command from 1 October 2018 to 31 August 2019, succeeding Lt Gen Abhay Krishna.

On 1 September 2019, he was appointed Vice Chief of the Army Staff (VCOAS) when Lt Gen Devraj Anbu retired on 31 August, and became the senior-most serving general after Bipin Rawat. On 16 December 2019 (Vijay Diwas eve) he was announced as the successor of Rawat as COAS on 31 December 2019.

Naravane is the 3rd general from the Sikh Light Infantry to become Chief of the Army Staff, the others were Ved Prakash Malik of the 18th COAS and Bikram Singh of the 24th COAS.

Personal life 
Naravane is from Pune, Maharashtra. He paints, practices yoga, and gardens. His wife, Veena Naravane, is a teacher and former president of Army Wives Welfare Association. They have two daughters.

Honours and decorations 
He has received the Param Vishisht Seva Medal (2019), Ati Vishisht Seva Medal (2017), Sena Medal, Vishist Seva Medal (2015), and the CoAS commendation card for his service. He is also the Colonel of the Regiment of the Sikh Light Infantry.

Dates of rank

References 

Living people
Chiefs of Army Staff (India)
Vice Chiefs of Army Staff (India)
Recipients of the Param Vishisht Seva Medal
Recipients of the Ati Vishisht Seva Medal
National Defence Academy (India) alumni
1960 births
People from Pune
Indian generals
Indian Military Academy alumni
Recipients of the Sena Medal
Recipients of the Vishisht Seva Medal
Indian military attachés
Army War College, Mhow alumni
Defence Services Staff College alumni